Tessa Lynne Thompson (born October 3, 1983) is an American actress. She began her professional acting career with the Los Angeles Women's Shakespeare Company while studying at Santa Monica College. She appeared in productions of The Tempest and Romeo and Juliet, the latter of which earned her a NAACP Theatre Award nomination. Her breakthrough came with leading roles in Tina Mabry's independent drama film Mississippi Damned (2009) and Tyler Perry's For Colored Girls (2010), an adaptation of the 1976 play of the same name.

Thompson gained favorable notices for her early film roles in the comedy-drama Dear White People (2014), and as civil rights activist Diane Nash in Ava DuVernay's historical drama Selma (2014). She gained mainstream attention for her roles in franchise films, playing Bianca Taylor in the sport drama Creed (2015), Creed II (2018) and Creed III (2023), and as Valkyrie in the Marvel Cinematic Universe superhero films Thor: Ragnarok (2017), Avengers: Endgame (2019), and Thor: Love and Thunder (2022), as well as her leading role in Men in Black: International (2019). 

She has received acclaim for her roles in the independent films Sorry to Bother You (2018), Little Woods (2018), Annihilation (2018), Sylvie's Love (2020), and Passing (2021), the latter of which earned her a BAFTA Award for Best Actress nomination.

On television, she starred in the noir drama series Veronica Mars (2005–2006), the drama series Copper (2012–2013), and the science fiction series Westworld (2016–2022) as Charlotte Hale and Dolores Abernathy. She received a Primetime Emmy Award nomination for her work as a producer on Sylvie's Love. In 2017, she received a BAFTA Rising Star Award nomination.

Early life and education
Thompson was born on October 3, 1983, in Los Angeles, California and raised between Los Angeles and Brooklyn, New York. Her father, singer-songwriter Marc Anthony Thompson, is Afro-Panamanian and the founder of the musical collective Chocolate Genius, Inc. Her mother is half Mexican and half white. Her younger paternal half-sister, Zsela, is a singer and songwriter.

Thompson attended Santa Monica High School where she played Hermia in a student production of A Midsummer Night's Dream, and attended Santa Monica College (SMC) where she studied cultural anthropology. While at SMC, she attended lectures by Lisa Wolpe of the Los Angeles Women's Shakespeare Company (LAWSC).

Career

Acting

In 2002, Thompson made her professional stage debut as one of three actors portraying the role of Ariel in LAWSC's production of The Tempest. In 2003, she appeared as Juliet in Romeo and Juliet: Antebellum New Orleans, 1836 with The Theatre @ Boston Court in Pasadena, California, which earned her an NAACP Theatre Award nomination.

Thompson made her first television appearance in a 2005 episode of the CBS crime drama series Cold Case in the role of a lesbian bootlegger from the 1930s. In the same year, she rose to fame as she landed the role of Jackie Cook on the UPN/CW neo-noir drama series Veronica Mars, starring as a series regular in season two. In 2006, she appeared on the ABC medical drama series Grey's Anatomy.

Thompson's first feature film appearance was in the 2006 remake of the horror film When a Stranger Calls playing the role of Scarlett. In 2007, she was a part of the cast on the CW's short-lived drama Hidden Palms, portraying Nikki Barnes. She was next seen opposite Mary Elizabeth Winstead in the dance film Make it Happen in 2008. She worked on guest star roles on the television series Life and Private Practice, and appeared in season four of Heroes.

In 2010, Thompson appeared in Tyler Perry's stage play adaptation For Colored Girls, after she directly approached Perry to be cast in the film. Also in 2010, she had a guest role as the wife of a detective on the drama series Detroit 187. In 2012, Thompson had a guest role as Gavin Doran's daughter, Sasha, on the horror series 666 Park Avenue. In 2013, she starred in BBC America's first original series Copper. 

In 2014, she starred as Samantha White in Justin Simien's Sundance-winning comedy Dear White People. That same year, Thompson played civil rights activist Diane Nash in Ava DuVernay's Martin Luther King Jr. biopic Selma. In 2015, she appeared in Ryan Coogler's Rocky sequel film Creed, and in Nate Ruess' short film The Grand Romantic.

In 2016, she began a starring role in the HBO science fiction drama series Westworld as board director Charlotte Hale. Also in 2016, Thompson appeared in the off-Broadway run of the Lydia R. Diamond play Smart People at Second Stage Theatre, starring alongside Mahershala Ali, Joshua Jackson and Anne Son.

In April 2016, Thompson was cast as Valkyrie in the Marvel Cinematic Universe superhero film Thor: Ragnarok, which was released on November 3, 2017. She appeared in the science fiction horror film Annihilation, which was released on February 23, 2018. In June 2017, Thompson was cast in the science fiction comedy Sorry to Bother You, which was released on July 6, 2018. She reprised her role as Bianca Taylor in the sports drama sequel film Creed II, which was released on November 21, 2018, to positive reviews and strong box office returns.

Thompson reprised her role as Valkryie in the superhero film Avengers: Endgame, which was released on April 26, 2019. She starred as Agent M in the Men in Black spin-off film, Men in Black: International, opposite Chris Hemsworth, her co-star from Thor: Ragnarok and Avengers: Endgame. The film was released on June 14, 2019. Also in 2019, she voiced Lady in the musical romance film Lady and the Tramp, a live-action adaptation of the 1955 film of the same name.

At the 2019 San Diego Comic-Con, it was announced that Thompson would reprise her role as King Valkyrie "Val" in the superhero film Thor: Love and Thunder (2022), as a part of Phase Four of the Marvel Cinematic Universe.

Thompson co-produced and voiced the lead role in the mystery sci-fi podcast series The Left Right Game, which was released in 2020. The audio drama series featured Thompson as a journalist who follows a story about a group of paranormal adventurers. Amazon Studios secured the screen rights to the series, with Thompson executive producing. Also in 2020, she starred as the title character in the romantic drama film Sylvie's Love, which premiered at the Sundance Film Festival. She will next star in the drama film Passing, which serves as Rebecca Hall's directorial debut. She started her own production company with a first look deal at HBO and would executive produce the adaption of two novels; Who Fears Death and The Secret Lives of Church Ladies. In October 2021, Thompson wrapped up production on drama film The Listener, directed by Steve Buscemi. Thompson will reportedly be the only on-screen role in the film. Thompson will also reprise her role as Bianca Taylor in the sport drama sequel Creed III (2023).

Music
Thompson is a singer-songwriter. She has in the past been a member of the Los Angeles-based indie electro soul band Caught A Ghost, and contributed to the soundtracks for both Creed and Creed II, for which she co-wrote and performed several songs with producer Moses Sumney.

Personal life
Thompson revealed in June 2018 that she is attracted to both men and women, but chooses not to label herself bisexual.

Filmography

Film

Television

Theater

Podcasts

Music videos

Awards and nominations

References

External links

 
 
 

1983 births
21st-century American actresses
Actresses from Los Angeles
African-American actresses
American actresses of Mexican descent
American film actresses
American people of Panamanian descent
American Shakespearean actresses
American stage actresses
American television actresses
American voice actresses
Hispanic and Latino American actresses
LGBT actresses
LGBT African Americans
American LGBT actors
LGBT Hispanic and Latino American people
LGBT people from California
Living people
Santa Monica College alumni